Major General Henry Newport Charles Heath  (15 October 1860 – 29 July 1915) was a British Army general during the First World War, who commanded the 48th (South Midland) Division from 1914 to 1915.

Early career
Heath was born into a military family, the second surviving son of Major-General Alfred Heath, Royal Artillery. He attended Clifton College and the Royal Military College, Sandhurst, before joining the 1st Battalion, South Staffordshire Regiment as a lieutenant on 22 October 1881. He served in the 1882 Anglo-Egyptian War and the 1884-85 Nile Expedition, where he was mentioned in dispatches for his role at the Battle of Kirbekan.

He transferred into the 1st Battalion, King's Own Yorkshire Light Infantry in 1889, was promoted to captain on 6 February 1889 with a brevet rank of major the following day. He later attended the Staff College, and on leaving took up a posting as a staff officer in the intelligence department at Army Headquarters in 1898 with the substantive rank of major from 27 August 1898. He remained on the staff during the first part of the Second Boer War, as he was in November 1899 appointed assistant adjutant-general and the chief staff officer for the lines of communication in South Africa. Mentioned in despatches, he received the brevet rank of lieutenant-colonel on 29 November 1900. In October 1901 he returned to his regiment to command the 2nd Battalion, stationed in South Africa. Following the end of the Second Boer war in June 1902, he returned to the United Kingdom on board the SS Ortona, which arrived in Southampton in September that year. On arrival he transferred to the command of the 1st Battalion stationed at Aldershot Garrison, with the substantive rank of lieutenant-colonel from 7 September 1902.

Senior command

Heath returned to the staff in 1904, promoted to colonel and made the assistant adjutant-general of the Second Corps, then posted to Army headquarters in 1906 and made GSO.1 in 1908. From 1910 to 1914 he commanded the regular 11th Infantry Brigade, at Colchester.

At the outbreak of the First World War, Heath had recently relinquished command of 11th Brigade to Aylmer Hunter-Weston. He was later given command of a newly mobilised Territorial division, the South Midland Division, and commanded it when it first went to France; however, in mid-June, he relinquished command after falling ill. He died shortly thereafter, on 29 July, aged 54 and was buried in Brookwood Cemetery in Woking.

Notes

References

 "HEATH, Maj.-Gen. Henry Newport Charles", in 
 

 

1860 births
1915 deaths
Companions of the Order of the Bath
South Staffordshire Regiment officers
Graduates of the Royal Military College, Sandhurst
King's Own Yorkshire Light Infantry officers
British Army personnel of the Anglo-Egyptian War
British Army personnel of the Mahdist War
British Army personnel of the Second Boer War
British Army generals of World War I
Graduates of the Staff College, Camberley
Burials at Brookwood Cemetery
British Army major generals
British military personnel killed in World War I